BeatBullying was an international charity aiming to empower young people to lead anti-bullying campaigns in their schools and local communities, and to build the capacity of local communities to sustain the work. BeatBullying devised bullying prevention strategies for young people by young people, focusing on "peer to peer" education and empowering young people to take action against incidents of bullying and help others combat the problem, both online and off.

In schools where BeatBullying has worked, their internal evaluation suggests that incidents of bullying have been reduced by an average of 39%.

BeatBullying suspended services in October 2014.

History 
BeatBullying was established in 1999 by its current CEO Emma-Jane Cross and became a registered charity in 2002. In 2009 it launched the Beatbullying website, an online peer mentoring service for 11- to 18-year-olds delivered via a social networking site. BeatBullying has worked directly and indirectly with 700,000+ young people over the last five years across the UK. 2013 saw the launch of MindFull, a mental health support site offering free counseling and peer support to people aged 11–17.

In October 2014, BeatBullying and MindFull suspended services and were placed in administration due to financial difficulties.

Activities 
BeatBullying used a range of techniques to deliver its bullying prevention model and engage with young people. As well as the core BB Mentoring that took place in schools, the charity provided an online social networking and mentoring service through the www.beatbullying.org website where young people mentored other young people about bullying and issues surrounding bullying and had access to specialist counsellors online.

Campaigns and policy work 
BeatBullying campaigned to shape attitudes and change behaviour relative both to on and offline bullying. It ran regular media campaigns including "The Big March", a digital demonstration where instead of streets, the public was invited to sign up, create their own BeatBullying Big March avatar and march across global websites for the right of children and young people across the world to be able to live without fear of bullying and cyberbullying. The march was to end with BeatBullying delivering an e-petition to the European Commission, both online, and in Brussels. In 2014, The Big March was supported and joined by celebrities like Aston Merrygold, Little Mix and Jamie Laing from Made in Chelsea.

“click bullying into touch” was a campaign in conjunction with the now-defunct British tabloid newspaper, News of the World.

BeatBullying also worked with government and industry groups via taskforces such as UKCCIS to advise on bullying and to encourage changes in industry practice.

Awards 
2011
Gold: Digital Communications Campaign - IMC European Awards
Silver: Innovative Idea and Concept - IMC European Awards
Best Use of Digital - Third Sector Excellence Awards
Gold: Best Digital Promotions Campaign - IPM Awards
Silver: Best Charity/NGO/Public Sector Campaign - IPM Awards
Digital Leaders Programme - Digital Leaders
Innovative Brand Campaign - UTalk Marketing Innovation Awards
Innovation Champion - UTalk Marketing Innovation Awards

2010
Best Communications Campaign - Third Sector Excellence Awards
Making The Internet Safer - Nominet Internet Awards
Media Partnership 2010 - Business Charity Awards

2009
Britain's Children's Champion 2009 - NOTW Children's Champions Awards
Best use of Digital Media - Third Sector Excellence Awards
Charity Principal of the Year - Charity Times

2006
Charity of the Year – UK Charity Awards
Best use of New Media – UK Charity Awards

2005
Best Use of New Media - Charity Times Awards
Charity of the Year – UK Charity Awards
Children's Charity of the Year – UK Charity Awards

References

External links 

Charities based in London
1999 establishments in the United Kingdom
Anti-bullying charities